Dajti standing at  above sea level, is a mountain and national park on the edge of Tirana, Albania. The Dajti belongs to the Skanderbeg range. In winter, the mountain is often covered with snow and is a popular retreat for the local population of Tirana, which rarely sees snowfall. Its slopes have forests of pines, oak and beech, while its interior contains canyons, waterfalls, caves, a lake, and an ancient castle.

Protected area
Dajti National Park was declared a national park in 1966, and has an expanded area of about 29,384 hectares since 2006. The area is under shared jurisdiction between Albanian Agency of Protected Areas (AKZM) and Tirana Municipality Parks and Recreation Agency (APR). In 2019, the new Dajti Mt National Park tourist information centre was opened located near the TV and Radio towers along SH47 road in Fushe Dajt.

The mountain can be reached through a narrow asphalted mountain road onto an area known as Fusha e Dajtit. This was the location of a summer camp but now is the site of many restaurants and radio and TV transmitters. From this small area there is an excellent view of Tirana and its plain. This is the reason this place has been named as the Balcony of Tirana.

As of June 2005 hikers and visitors to the mountain can use an Austrian built gondola lift from the eastern outskirts of Tirana to Fusha e Dajtit (Plain of Dajti) at 1050 meters altitude. There are several radio and TV transmitters at the summit of the mountain.

Traces of prehistoric settlements and fortifications from later periods have been discovered in the area.

Environmental issues
 
A serious environmental problem on the mountain is how to deal with garbage. This is partially caused by restaurants and hotels that leave rubbish everywhere since there are few garbage bins in the region.

Another major problem on the mountain is deforestation. In the summer of 2012, 10 ha of forests were burned at the Priska summit. Forest fires are happening yearly while those responsible are not being convicted. Responsibilities lie with the Ministry of the Environment, Municipality of Tirana, foresters (rangers) and the people who live in the area.

Water pollution of the lake and air pollution caused by cars crossing the mountain roads are also problematic.

See also 

 Geography of Albania
 Mountains of Albania
 Dajti National Park
 Dajti Castle

Gallery

References 

 

Mountains of Albania
Geography of Tirana County
Tourist attractions in Tirana County
Dajti National Park